The 1934 Spanish Grand Prix (formally the IX Gran Premio de España) was a Grand Prix motor race, which was run on 23 September 1934 in  Lasarte, Spain.  The race lasted 519.45 km (17.32 km x 30 laps).  It was the 9th running of the Spanish Grand Prix.

Starting grid (3x3)

Classification 

Fastest Lap:  Hans Stuck (Auto Union A), 6:20.0

References

External links 
1934 Spanish Grand Prix - The Golden Era of Grand Prix Racing

Spanish Grand Prix
Spanish Grand Prix
Grand Prix